Dyspessa mogola is a moth in the family Cossidae. It was described by Yakovlev in 2007. It is found in Tadjikistan.

The length of the forewings is 10–11 mm. The forewings are light grey with a narrow dark border and light-yellow submarginal area. The postdiscal and discal zones are light-brown. The hindwings are light brown.

References

Natural History Museum Lepidoptera generic names catalog

Moths described in 2007
Dyspessa
Moths of Asia